Blanche Mehaffey (July 28, 1908 – March 31, 1968) was an American showgirl and film actress.

Early life and career

The daughter of Edward Mehaffey and his wife, soprano Blanche Berndt, she had a brother, Edward Mehaffey Jr. She started as a dancer with the Ziegfeld Follies before coming to Hollywood to play comedy roles in motion pictures. Show producer Florenz Ziegfeld said she possessed the most beautiful eyes in the entire world. She was among the Baby Stars of 1924 chosen by the Wampas. Others in that year's group were Clara Bow, Dorothy Mackaill, and Hazel Keener.

Her debut in movies was in the silent film Fully Insured (1923) at Hal Roach Studios. She played in many Hal Roach comedies for a number of years with her leading men usually Charley Chase and later Glenn Tryon. She occasionally appeared in features such A Woman of the World (1925) with Pola Negri. Mehaffey dropped out of filming to study voice and languages for over a year in New York City. Mehaffey returned to movies in The Sunrise Trail (1931), a film which featured her playing opposite cowboy star Bob Steele. The motion picture was her first talkie movie.

Personal life
Mehaffey wed oil-well supply dealer George Joseph Hausen at the Jonathan Club in Los Angeles, California on January 4, 1928. Ten weeks later, she obtained an interlocutory divorce decree. She was also married to the film producer Ralph M. Like.

Death
Blanche Mehaffey died in Los Angeles, California in 1968 of a drug overdose.

Filmography

 The Battling Orioles (1924)
 The White Sheep (1924)
 His People (1925)
 A Woman of the World (1925)
 The Texas Streak (1926)
 The Runaway Express (1926)
 Take It from Me (1926)
 The Silent Rider (1927)
 The Denver Dude (1927)
 The Tired Business Man (1927)
 Finnegan's Ball (1927)
 The Princess from Hoboken (1927)
 Marlie the Killer (1928)
 Air Mail Pilot (1928)
 Smilin' Guns (1929)
 Mounted Fury (1931)
 The Sunrise Trail (1931)
 Dugan of the Badlands (1931)
 Soul of the Slums (1931)
 The Sky Spider (1931)
 White Renegade (1931)
 Riders of the North (1931)
 Dancing Dynamite (1931)
 The Mystery Trooper (1931)
 Is There Justice? (1931)
 Sally of the Subway (1932)
 Passport to Paradise (1932)
 Alias Mary Smith (1932)
 Hypnotized (1932)
 Dynamite Denny (1932)
 Border Guns (1934)
 North of Arizona (1935)
 The Outlaw Tamer (1935)
 The Silent Code (1935)
 The Cowboy and the Bandit (1935)
 Wildcat Saunders (1936)
 The Sea Fiend (1936)
 Held for Ransom (1938)
 The Wages of Sin (1938)

References

External links

American film actresses
American silent film actresses
American female dancers
Dancers from Ohio
Western (genre) film actresses
Actresses from Cincinnati
20th-century American actresses
Place of birth missing
Place of death missing
1908 births
1968 deaths
WAMPAS Baby Stars
Drug-related deaths in California
20th-century American dancers